Love Comes Close is the first album from the American Darkwave band Cold Cave, released in November 2009 on Matador Records.

Release and reception

Love Comes Close was released on November 3, 2009 by Matador Records, on 12" vinyl, CD, and Digital formats. On Metacritic it has a rating of 69 out of 100 based on reviews from 10 critics.

Pitchfork's Zach Kelly gave Love Comes Close a positive review with a score of 7.6. He describes singer Wesley Eisold's voice as a "devilish baritone channeling the vocal reticence of Ian Curtis one moment and the yearning of The National's Matt Berninger the next."

In a mixed review from PopMatters, Matthew Collins said, "Love Comes Close shows some potential for artist growth with a little more seasoned songwriting."

The track "Life Magazine" was used in a 2009 RadioShack commercial, and as a soundtrack in the Konami game Pro Evolution Soccer 2012.

Track listing
 "Cebe and Me" – 3:43
 "Love Comes Close" – 4:26
 "Life Magazine" – 2:56
 "The Laurels of Erotomania" – 2:53
 "Heaven Was Full" – 3:43
 "The Trees Grew Emotions and Died" – 4:04
 "Hello Rats" – 1:49
 "Youth and Lust" – 4:01
 "I.C.D.K." – 3:49 
Bonus tracks
 "Double Lives in Single Beds" – 2:46
 "Theme from Tomorrowland" – 4:44
 "Now That I'm in the Future" – 3:12

Personnel
Music
 Wesley Eisold – uncredited
 Sean Martin (Hatebreed) – guitar (tracks 2, 6), bass (track 3)
 Caralee McElroy (Xiu Xiu) – uncredited

Recording and production
 Eric Broucek – mixing (tracks 1, 2, 5)
 Cold Cave – production, recording
 Steven De Palo – mixing (tracks 3, 4, 6, 8, 9), mastering
 Gary Olson – mixing (track 7)

Artwork and design
 Pete Ashton – booklet photographs
 Wesley Eisold – cover and inside panel photographs
 Anthony Smyrski – layout

References

External links

2009 debut albums
Matador Records albums
Cold Cave albums